Gabyna is a genus of moths of the family Erebidae. The genus was described by Heinrich Benno Möschler in 1880.

Species
Gabyna coerulina (Möschler, 1880) Suriname
Gabyna erratrix Möschler, 1880 Suriname
Gabyna metaloba Hampson, 1926 Peru
Gabyna placida Butler, 1879 Brazil (Amazonas)

References

Calpinae